The 1937 Cheltenham by-election was a parliamentary by-election held on 22 June 1937 for the British House of Commons constituency of Cheltenham in Gloucestershire.

The seat had become vacant when the constituency's Conservative Member of Parliament (MP), Sir Walter Preston, had resigned from the House of Commons on 27 May 1937. He had held the seat since a by-election in 1928, having previously been MP for Mile End from 1918 to 1923.

The local Conservative party refused to endorse Daniel Lipson as its candidate following an anti-Jewish whispering campaign.  Lipson won as an Independent Conservative and was re-elected at the 1945 general election as a National Independent, although his vote collapsed in the 1950 election when he lost to the Conservative Party candidate William Hicks Beach.

Votes

See also
 Cheltenham constituency
 1911 Cheltenham by-election
 1928 Cheltenham by-election
 Cheltenham
 Lists of United Kingdom by-elections
 United Kingdom by-election records

References
 

1937 elections in the United Kingdom
1937 in England
Politics of Cheltenham
By-elections to the Parliament of the United Kingdom in Gloucestershire constituencies
20th century in Gloucestershire